Bob La Masney is an American sound engineer. He is known for his work on the television programs Mom, The Big Bang Theory, B Positive, Mike & Molly, Two and a Half Men and Sister, Sister. He has won thirteen Primetime Emmy Awards and has been nominated for twenty-two more in the category Outstanding Sound Mixing.

References

External links 

Living people
Place of birth missing (living people)
Year of birth missing (living people)
American audio engineers
20th-century American engineers
21st-century American engineers
Primetime Emmy Award winners